Washoe (c. September 1965 – October 30, 2007) was a female common chimpanzee who was the first non-human to learn to communicate using American Sign Language (ASL) as part of an animal research experiment on animal language acquisition.

Washoe learned approximately 350 signs of ASL, also teaching her adopted son Loulis some signs. She spent most of her life at Central Washington University.

Early life
Washoe was born in West Africa in 1965. She was captured for use by the US Air Force for research for the US space program. Washoe was named after Washoe County, Nevada, where she was raised and taught to use ASL.

In 1967, R. Allen Gardner and Beatrix Gardner established a project to teach Washoe ASL at the University of Nevada, Reno. At the time, previous attempts to teach chimpanzees to imitate vocal languages (the Gua and Viki projects) had failed. The Gardners believed that these projects were flawed because chimpanzees are physically unable to produce the voiced sounds required for oral language. Their solution was to utilize the chimpanzee's ability to create diverse body gestures, which is how they communicate in the wild, by starting a language project based on American Sign Language. The Gardners raised Washoe as one would raise a child. She frequently wore clothes and sat with them at the dinner table. Washoe had her own 8-foot-by-24-foot trailer complete with living and cooking areas. The trailer had a couch, drawers, a refrigerator, and a bed with sheets and blankets. She had access to clothing, combs, toys, books, and a toothbrush. Much like a human child, she underwent a regular routine with chores, outdoor play, and rides in the family car. Upon seeing a swan, Washoe signed "water" and "bird". Harvard psychologist Roger Brown said that "was like getting an S.O.S. from outer space".

When Washoe was five, the Gardners decided to move on to other projects, and she was moved to the University of Oklahoma's Institute of Primate Studies in Norman, Oklahoma, under the care of Roger Fouts and Deborah Fouts.

ASL instruction and usage

Teaching method

Washoe was raised in an environment as close as possible to that of a human child, in an attempt to satisfy her psychological need for companionship.

While with Washoe, the Gardners and Foutses were careful to communicate only in ASL with Washoe, rather than using vocal communication, on the assumption that this would create a less confusing learning environment for Washoe. This technique was said to resemble that used when teaching human children language.

After the first couple of years of the language project, the Gardners and Roger Fouts discovered that Washoe could pick up ASL gestures without direct instruction, but instead by observing humans around her who were signing amongst themselves. For example, the scientists signed "toothbrush" to each other while they brushed their teeth near her. At the time of observation, Washoe showed no signs of having learned the sign, but on a later occasion she reacted to the sight of a toothbrush by spontaneously producing the correct sign, thereby showing that she had in fact previously learned the ASL sign. Moreover, the Gardners began to realize that rewarding particular signs with food and tickles was actually interfering with the intended result of conversational sign language. They changed their strategy so that food and meal times were never juxtaposed with instruction times. In addition, they stopped the tickle rewards during instruction because these generally resulted in laughing breakdowns. Instead, they set up a conversational environment that evoked communication, without the use of rewards for specific actions.

Confirmed signs
Washoe learned approximately 350 words of sign languages.

For researchers to consider that Washoe had learned a sign, she had to use it spontaneously and appropriately for 14 consecutive days.

These signs were then further tested using a double-blind vocabulary test. This test demonstrated 1) "that the chimpanzee subjects could communicate information under conditions in which the only source of information available to a human observer was the signing of the chimpanzee;" 2) "that independent observers agreed with each other;" and 3) "that the chimpanzees used the signs to refer to natural language categories—that the sign DOG could refer to any dog, FLOWER to any flower, SHOE to any shoe."

Combinations of signs
Washoe and her mates were able to combine the hundreds of signs that they learned into novel combinations (that they had never been taught, but rather created themselves) with different meanings. For instance, when Washoe's mate Moja didn't know the word for "thermos", Moja referred to it as a "METAL CUP DRINK"; however, whether or not Washoe's combinations constitute genuine inventive language is controversial, as Herbert S. Terrace contended by concluding that seeming sign combinations did not stand for a single item, but rather were three individual signs. Taking the thermos example, rather than METAL CUP DRINK being a composite meaning thermos, it could be that Washoe was indicating there was an item of metal (METAL), one shaped like a cup (CUP), and that could be drunk out of (DRINK).

Self-awareness and emotion 
One of Washoe's caretakers was pregnant and missed work for many weeks after she miscarried. Roger Fouts recounts the following situation:

Washoe herself lost two children. One baby chimpanzee died of a heart defect shortly after birth; the other baby, Sequoyah, died of a staph infection at two months of age.

When Washoe was shown an image of herself in the mirror, and asked what she was seeing, she replied: "Me, Washoe." Primate expert Jane Goodall, who has studied and lived with chimpanzees for decades, believes that this might indicate some level of self-awareness. Washoe appeared to experience an identity crisis when she was first introduced to other chimpanzees, seeming shocked to learn that she was not the only chimpanzee. She gradually came to enjoy associating with other chimpanzees.

Washoe enjoyed playing pretend with her dolls, which she would bathe and talk to and would act out imaginary scenarios. She also spent time brushing her teeth, painting and taking tea parties.

When new students came to work with Washoe, she would slow down her rate of signing for novice speakers of sign language, which had a humbling effect on many of them.

Quotes

(In this section double quotes are signed by Washoe, single by someone else.)

 "Peekaboo (i.e. hide and seek) I go"
 "Baby (doll) in my drink (i.e. cup)" (when doll placed in her cup)
 "Time Eat?" and "you me time eat?"
 Asked 'Who's coming?' Responded "Mrs G" (correct).
 "You, Me out go". 'OK but first clothes' (Washoe puts on jacket.)
 "Good, go", 'Where Go', "You Me Peekaboo"
 'What That' "Shoe" 'Whose That Shoe' "Yours" 'What color' "Black".

Later life and death

Washoe was moved to Central Washington University in 1980. On October 30, 2007, officials from the Chimpanzee and Human Communication Institute on the CWU campus announced that she had died at the age of 42.

Impact on bioethics

Some believe that the fact that Washoe not only communicated, but also formed close and personal relationships with humans indicates that she was emotionally sensitive and deserving of moral status.

Work with Washoe and other signing primates motivated the foundation of the Great Ape Project, which hopes to "include the non-human great apes: chimpanzees, orangutans and gorillas within the community of equals by granting them the basic moral and legal protections that only humans currently enjoy", in order to place them in the moral category of "persons" rather than private property.

Related animal language projects
The publication of the Washoe experiments spurred a revival in the scholarly study of sign language, due to widespread interest in questions it raised about the biological roots of language. This included additional experiments which attempted to teach great apes language in a more controlled environment.

Herbert Terrace and Thomas Bever's Nim Chimpsky project failed in its attempt to replicate the results of Washoe. While Nim was successfully trained to use 125 signs, Terrace and his colleagues concluded that the chimpanzee did not show any meaningful sequential behavior that rivaled human grammar. Nim's use of language was strictly pragmatic, as a means of obtaining an outcome, unlike a human child's, which can serve to generate or express meanings, thoughts or ideas. There was nothing Nim could be taught that could not equally well be taught to a pigeon using the principles of operant conditioning. The researchers therefore questioned claims made on behalf of Washoe, and argued that the apparently impressive results may have amounted to nothing more than a "Clever Hans" effect, not to mention a relatively informal experimental approach.

Critics of primate linguistic studies include Thomas Sebeok, American semiotician and investigator of nonhuman communication systems, who wrote:  

Sebeok also made pointed comparisons of Washoe with Clever Hans. Some evolutionary psychologists, in effect agreeing with Noam Chomsky, argue that the apparent impossibility of teaching language to animals is indicative that the ability to use language is an innately human development.

Washoe's advocates disagreed that the research had been discredited, attributing the failure of the Nim Chimpsky and other projects to poor teaching, and to Nim's being consistently isolated in a sterile laboratory environment, and often confined in cages, for his entire life. Nim did most of his learning in a white eight-foot-by-eight-foot laboratory room (with one of the walls containing a one-way mirror), where he was often trained to use signs without the referent present. Living in this setting, Nim did not receive the same level of nurturing, affection, and life experience, and many have suggested that this impaired his cognitive development, as happens with human children subjected to such an environment.

Other great ape language research projects, such as on Koko the gorilla, have received similar criticism to Project Washoe as to the selective interpretation of the use of sign language by apes and lack of objectivity.

See also
Kanzi
Animal cognition
Great ape language
Koko (gorilla)
List of individual apes
Alex (parrot), talking parrot
Batyr (elephant)

References

Further reading

External links 
Friends of Washoe—a non-profit organization
A conversation with Warshoe - When Her Caretaker Told The Chimp She Had Lost Her Baby

Apes from language studies
Primatology
1965 animal births
2007 animal deaths
Deaths from influenza
Individual chimpanzees
American Sign Language